VIOS may refer to:

 Voice I/O System, Digital Research Access Manager for Concurrent DOS
 ViOS, Visual Internet Operating System
 Toyota Vios, a subcompact automobile

See also
 Vio (disambiguation)